Crazy Days is the fourth studio album by Canadian country music artist Adam Gregory. It was released in Canada on March 24, 2009, by Big Machine/NSA/Midas. The album contains the singles "Crazy Days," "What It Takes" and "Could I Just Be Me."

Track listing

Personnel
 Richard "Spady" Brannon – bass guitar
 Steve Brewster – drums
 Pat Buchanan – electric guitar
 Gary Burnette – acoustic guitar
 Perry Coleman – background vocals
 Larry Franklin – fiddle, mandolin
 Adam Gregory – lead vocals
 Charlie Judge – keyboards, organ, piano
 Kerry Marx – electric guitar
 Greg Morrow – drums
 Jimmy Nichols – keyboards, organ, piano
 Scotty Sanders – steel guitar

References

2009 albums
Adam Gregory albums
Big Machine Records albums
Midas Records Nashville albums